Avicennia germinans, the black mangrove, is a shrub or small tree growing up to 12 meters (39 feet) in the acanthus family, Acanthaceae. It grows in tropical and subtropical regions of the Americas, on both the Atlantic and Pacific Coasts, and on the Atlantic Coast of tropical Africa, where it thrives on the sandy and muddy shores where seawater reaches. It is common throughout coastal areas of Texas and Florida, and ranges as far north as southern Louisiana and coastal Georgia in the United States.

Like many other mangrove species, it reproduces by vivipary. Seeds are encased in a fruit, which reveals the germinated seedling when it falls into the water.

Unlike other mangrove species, it does not grow on prop roots, but possesses pneumatophores that allow its roots to breathe even when submerged. It is a hardy species and expels absorbed salt mainly from its leathery leaves.

The name "black mangrove" refers to the color of the trunk and heartwood. The leaves often appear whitish from the salt excreted at night and on cloudy days. It is often found in its native range with the red mangrove (Rhizophora mangle) and the white mangrove (Laguncularia racemosa). White mangroves grow inland from black mangroves, which themselves grow inland from red mangroves. The three species work together to stabilize the shoreline, provide buffers from storm surges, trap debris and detritus brought in by tides, and provide feeding, breeding, and nursery grounds for a great variety of fish, shellfish, birds, and other wildlife.

Habitat

The black mangrove grows just above the high tide in coastal   It is less tolerant of highly saline conditions than certain other species that occur in mangrove ecosystems. It can reach  in height, although it is a small shrub in cooler regions of its range. The seeds germinate in midsummer, but may be seen all year on the trees. The seeds can remain viable for over a year once released.

Wood
The heartwood is dark-brown to black, while the sapwood is yellow-brown. It has the unusual property of having less dense heartwood than sapwood. The sapwood sinks in water while the heartwood floats. The wood is strong, heavy, and hard, but is difficult to work due to its interlocked grain, and is somewhat difficult to finish due to its oily texture. Uses include posts, pilings, charcoal, and fuel. Despite growing in a marine environment, the dry wood is subject to attack by marine borers and termites. Like many species, it contains tannins in the bark and has been used to tan leather products.

References

Further reading

External links

Interactive Distribution Map of Avicennia germinans 

germinans
Mangroves
Halophytes
Afrotropical realm flora
Neotropical realm flora
Tropical Atlantic flora
Tropical Eastern Pacific flora
Trees of Africa
Trees of North America
Trees of Central America
Trees of South America
Trees of the Caribbean
Plants described in 1764
Taxa named by Carl Linnaeus